The BBC Charter is a royal charter setting out the arrangements for the governance of the British Broadcasting Corporation.

An accompanying agreement recognises its editorial independence and sets out its public obligations in detail.

The initial BBC Charter established the BBC on 1 January 1927 as a replacement for the British Broadcasting Company Ltd. which had provided the broadcasting service until that point. As the royal charter created an entirely new body, separate arrangements were made to transfer the assets of the British Broadcasting Company to the new British Broadcasting Corporation via the Postmaster General. It was felt that establishing a body under a royal charter to replace the private company would allow the creation of a body that acted "as a trustee for the national interest" and would "endow the [BBC] with a prestige and influence which will be of special value to it."

Upon the expiry of the first charter, it was renewed with a replacement charter – a process that has continued ever since. It, and each subsequent royal charter, was initially for a period for ten years, except for the charter from 1947 to 1952, which ran for five years, and the charter from 2006 to 2017, which ran for eleven years. However, several charters were extended in duration, including 1947 (six months), 1952 (two years), and 1964 (two extensions totalling five years).

The most recent charter took effect on 1 January 2017 and will run until 31 December 2027.

References

External links
 

Charter